Philip Paul Bliss (9 July 1838 – 29 December 1876) was an American composer, conductor, writer of hymns and a bass-baritone Gospel singer. He wrote many well-known hymns, including "Hold the Fort" (1870), "Almost Persuaded" (1871); "Hallelujah, What a Saviour!" (1875); "Let the Lower Lights Be Burning"; "Wonderful Words of Life" (1875); and the tune for Horatio Spafford's "It Is Well with My Soul" (1876).
Bliss was a recognized friend of D. L. Moody, the famous Chicago preacher. Bliss died in the Ashtabula River Railroad Disaster on his way to one of Moody's meetings. An outspoken Abolitionist, he served as a Lieutenant during the American Civil War.

Bliss's house in Rome, Pennsylvania, is now operated as the Philip P. Bliss Gospel Songwriters Museum.

Early life
P. P. Bliss was born in Hollywood, Clearfield County, Pennsylvania in a log cabin. His father was Mr. Isaac Bliss, who taught the family to pray daily, and his mother was Lydia Doolittle. He loved music and was allowed to develop his passion for singing. His sister was Mary Elizabeth Willson, a gospel singer, singer, composer and evangelist.

When he was a boy, Bliss's family moved to Kinsman, Ohio in 1844, and then returned to Pennsylvania in 1847, settling first in Espeyville, Crawford County, and a year later in Tioga County.  Bliss had little formal education and was taught by his mother, from the Bible.

At age 10, while selling vegetables to help support the family, Bliss first heard a piano. At age 11, he left home to make his own living. He worked in timber camps and sawmills. While working, he irregularly went to school to further his education.

Teaching
At 17, Bliss finished his requirements to teach. The next year, in 1856, he became a schoolmaster at Hartsville, New York, and during the summer he worked on a farm.

In 1857, Bliss met J. G. Towner, who taught singing. Towner recognized Bliss's talent and gave him his first formal voice training. He also met William B. Bradbury, who persuaded him to become a music teacher. His first musical composition was sold for a flute. In 1858, he took up an appointment in Rome Academy, Pennsylvania.

In 1858, in Rome, Bliss met Lucy J. Young, whom he married on June 1, 1859. She came from a musical family and encouraged the development of his talent. She was a Presbyterian, and Bliss joined her Church.

At age 22, Bliss became an itinerant music teacher. On horseback, he went from community to community accompanied by a melodeon. In July 1860, the Normal Academy of Music was held in Geneseo, New York was being held for the music community. Musicians of renown were administrating the six-week event. Bliss was excited about it, but when he realized that he could in no way afford the expense of the school, he was heartbroken. He knew it would be a great experience for him, but he had no money. When (Bliss' wife's) Grandma Allen noticed his sad demeanor she was full of sympathy. She asked him what it costs, he replied that it would "cost as much as thirty dollars". After telling him that thirty dollars "was a good deal of money", she told him of her old stocking into which she had been "dropping pieces of silver for a good many years.” She had Bliss count the amount of money in the stocking and realized it had more than the amount needed. "And Bliss spent six weeks of the heartiest study of his life at the Normal". Bliss was now recognized as an expert within his local area. He continued the itinerant teaching.

At this time he turned to composition. None of his songs were ever copyrighted.

Evangelist
In 1864, the Blisses moved to Chicago. Bliss was then 26. He became known as a singer and teacher. He wrote a number of Gospel songs. Bliss was paid $100 for a concert tour which lasted only a fortnight. He was amazed so much money could be earned so quickly. The following week, he was drafted for service in the Union Army. Because the  Civil War was almost over, his notice was canceled after a few weeks. The unit he served with was the 149th Pennsylvania Infantry.

Following this, Bliss went on another concert tour, but this failed. He was, however, offered a position at Root and Cady Musical Publishers, at a salary of $150 per month. Bliss worked with this company from 1865 until 1873. He conducted musical conventions, singing schools and concerts for his employers. He continued to compose hymns, which were often printed in his employer's books.

In 1869, Bliss formed an association with Dwight L. Moody. Moody and others urged him to give up his job and become a missionary singer. In 1874, Bliss decided he was called to full-time Christian evangelism. Bliss made significant amounts of money from royalties and gave them to charity and to support his evangelical endeavours.

Bliss wrote the gospel song "Hold the Fort" after hearing Major Daniel Webster Whittle narrate an experience in the American Civil War.

Death

On 29 December 1876, the Pacific Express train on which Bliss and his wife were traveling approached Ashtabula, Ohio. When the train was nearly across the bridge it collapsed and the carriages fell into the ravine below. It was stated in many newspaper accounts of the time that Bliss escaped from the wreck, but the carriages caught fire and Bliss returned to try to extricate his wife. This account was only given by J.E. Burchell. As mentioned in the P.P. Bliss Memoirs, written in 1877 by D.W. Whittle this account by J.E. Burchell was only his conjecture. In fact, Mr. Whittle showed a picture of Bliss to all surviving passengers and no one recognized Mr. Bliss but only one lady who gave no account of seeing him during the accident. No trace of either Mr. Bliss or his wife, Lucy, was discovered. Ninety-two of the 159 passengers are believed to have died in what became known as the Ashtabula River Railroad Disaster.

The Blisses were survived by their two sons, George and Philip Paul, then aged four and one, respectively.

A monument to Bliss was erected in Rome, Pennsylvania. 

Found in his trunk, which somehow survived the crash and fire, was a manuscript bearing the lyrics of the only well-known Bliss Gospel song for which he did not write a tune: "I Will Sing of My Redeemer." Soon thereafter, set to a tune specially written for it by James McGranahan, it became one of the first songs recorded by Thomas Edison.

Works
According to the Philip P. Bliss Gospel Songwriters Museum, the books of songs by Bliss are as follows: The Charm (1871); The Song Tree, a collection of parlor and concert music (1872); The Sunshine for Sunday Schools (1873); The Joy for conventions and for church choir music (1873); and Gospel Songs for Gospel meetings and Sunday schools (1874). All of these books were copyrighted by John Church and Co.

In addition to these publications, in 1875, Bliss compiled, and in connection with Ira D. Sankey, edited Gospel Hymns and Sacred Songs.  She (who is she?) brought many Methodist hymns in her suitcase with across the Atlantic.  One of her most repeated by Bliss was "Man of Sorrows! What a name".  In 1876, his last work was the preparation of the book known as Gospel Hymns No. 2, Sankey being associated with him as editor. These last two books are published by John Church and Co. and Biglow and Main jointly - the work of Mr. Bliss in them, under the copyright of John Church and Co.  The gospel songs were popular fetching $30,000 shortly before his death.  

Many of his pieces appear in the books of George F. Root and Horatio R. Palmer, and many were published in sheet music form. A large number of his popular pieces were published in The Prize, a book of Sunday school songs edited by Root in 1870.

Three of his hymns appear in the 1985 hymnbook of the Church of Jesus Christ of Latter-day Saints: Brightly Beams Our Father's Mercy (#335) (also known as Let the Lower Lights Be Burning); More Holiness Give Me (#131); and Should You Feel Inclined to Censure (#235) (words by an anonymous writer put to the tune of  "Brightly Beams Our Father's Mercy"}.

Connection to Titanic
Survivors of the RMS Titanic disaster, including Dr. Washington Dodge, reported that passengers in lifeboats sang the Bliss hymn "Pull For The Shore", some while rowing. During a 11 May 1912 luncheon talk at the Commonwealth Club in San Francisco, just a few weeks after his family and he survived the sinking of the ocean liner, Dodge recounted:

"Watching the vessel closely, it was seen from time to time that this submergence forward was increasing. No one in our boat, however, had any idea that the ship was in any danger of sinking. In spite of the intense cold, a cheerful atmosphere pervaded those present, and they indulged from time to time in jesting and even singing `Pull for (the) Shore' ..."

Further reading 
Ninde, Edward S.; The Story of the American Hymn, New York: Abingdon Press, 1921.
Wells, Amos R.; A Treasure of Hymns, Boston: United Society of Christian Endeavour, 1914

References

External links

 
 
 Spafford Hymn Manuscript Peace Like a River / It is Well with my Soul - as originally penned by Horatio Spafford
 Christian Biography Resources
 The Memoirs of PP Bliss
 The Music of Philip Paul Bliss
 Philip P. Bliss Gospel Songwriters Museum
 Free scores Mutopia Project
 Song victories of "The Bliss and Sankey hymns" page 139-156
 Twilight alley : operetta for treble voices in two acts, 1919 publication, digitized by BYU on archive.org

1838 births
1876 deaths
Railway accident deaths in the United States
American Christian hymnwriters
American evangelicals
American evangelists
People from Clearfield County, Pennsylvania
Musicians from Pennsylvania
19th-century American writers
Union Army soldiers
19th-century American musicians
Songwriters from Pennsylvania
People from Kinsman, Ohio